José da Cunha may refer to:

 José Gerson da Cunha (1844–1900),  a Goan physician
 José Anastácio da Cunha (1744–1787), a Portuguese mathematician
 José da Cunha Taborda (1766–1836), a Portuguese painter and architect
 José Narciso da Cunha Rodrigues (born 1940), a Portuguese jurist and judge
 José Messias da Cunha (1928–2015), known as José Messias, a Brazilian singer and media personality
 José Policarpo da Cunha (1935–2013), known as Zeca Cunha, a Hong Kong field hockey player
 José Cunha (footballer) (born 2001), Portuguese footballer
 José da Cunha (racing driver)